Thankful is the debut studio album by American duo Mary Mary. It was released on May 2, 2000, through Columbia Records in the United States. Chiefly produced by Warryn Campbell, the album is gospel music with stylings of contemporary R&B. It produced the smash crossover hit "Shackles (Praise You)", which reached the top ten in seven countries and the single "I Sings", which was also a significant hit. Thankful established Mary Mary as one of the leading artists in contemporary Christian music, and won the duo the Grammy Award for Best Contemporary R&B Gospel Album at the 43rd awards ceremony as well as a Dove Award, a Lady of Soul Award, and a Stellar Award.

Critical reception 

The album received generally favorable reviews from music critics. William Ruhlmann from AllMusic gave Thankful a grade of four and a half out of five stars. He wrote that "Thankful is pure gospel music, a series of praise songs and cautionary tales with religious messages, but it is likely to have a broader appeal than most gospel music." Cross Rhythms felt that Mary Mary "look set for big things both on the secular and gospel market. That's because they have very attractive vocals and the use the very same musical styles and beats currently popular within secular R&B. But somehow, even though their lyrical content is very much gospel-based, they've managed to appeal equally to the secular market."

Chart performance 
Thankful peaked at number one on the US Top Gospel Albums, number twenty-two on the US Billboard Top R&B/Hip-Hop Albums and number fifty-nine on the US Billboard 200. It was certified platinum by the Recording Industry Association of America (RIAA) for selling over 1.2 million copies in the United States.

Track listing 

Samples
 "Shackles (Praise You)" contains a replayed bass sample from "Don't Look Any Further", performed by Dennis Edwards & Siedah Garrett.
 "Can't Give Up Now" contains a replayed sample from "I Don't Feel No Ways Tired", performed by Rev. James Cleveland.
 "Good to Me" contains a replayed sample from "Give Me Your Love", written & performed by Curtis Mayfield.

Charts

Weekly charts

Year-end charts

Certifications

References 

2000 debut albums
Mary Mary albums
Albums produced by Warryn Campbell
Columbia Records albums